Mary Augusta Scott (1851–1918) was a scholar and professor of English at Smith College. She was one of the first women to receive a PhD from Yale University, in 1894.

Biography
Scott was born in Dayton, Ohio, and received her master's degree at Vassar College. She studied at Newnham College, University of Cambridge, Johns Hopkins University, and Yale University; she earned her Ph.D. from Yale in 1894.

A professor of English at Smith College from 1902, Scott edited and published The Essays of Francis Bacon. She also completed Elizabethan Translations from the Italian, published in the Vassar Semi-Centennial Series in 1916, and reviewed by the Journal of Modern Philology in 1918. She was a frequent contributor to The Dial and other literary and academic journals.

Death and legacy
Scott died in 1918. The Mary Augusta Scott Papers, ca. 1870 - 1917, are held at Vassar College Archives and Special Collections.

In 2016, a portrait of the first seven women to receive Ph.D.s from Yale, which those seven women all did in 1894, was placed in Sterling Memorial Library at Yale.  The women include Scott, Elizabeth Deering Hanscom, Margaretta Palmer, Charlotte Fitch Roberts, Cornelia H.B. Rogers, Sara Bulkley Rogers, and Laura Johnson Wylie. The portrait is the first painting hanging in Sterling Memorial Library to have women as subjects. Brenda Zlamany was the artist.

Works
 The Essays of Francis Bacon (editor) (New York, 1908)
 Elizabethan translations from the Italian (1916)

References

1851 births
1918 deaths
Yale University alumni
Vassar College alumni
Smith College faculty
Writers from Dayton, Ohio
American women essayists
20th-century American women writers
20th-century American essayists
American women academics